2008 HJ is a sub-kilometer asteroid, classified as near-Earth object of the Apollo group.

It was discovered by Lincoln Laboratory ETS, New Mexico. Observers M. Bezpalko, D. Torres, R. Kracke, G. Spitz, J. Kistler. Richard Miles using the Faulkes Telescope South at Siding Spring Observatory, Australia determined that the asteroid rotates rapidly. It measures only 12 m by 24 m and is very dense, having a mass of about 5,000 tonnes. If the asteroid were not dense, it is probable that the rapid rotation would cause the asteroid to disrupt and fly apart.

At the time of discovery,  had the smallest known rotation period in the Solar System, completing one revolution every 42.7 seconds.

It is listed on the Sentry Risk Table with a 1 in 17,000 chance of impacting Earth on May 2, 2081. An impact from this object would be comparable to the Chelyabinsk meteor.

See also
List of fast rotators (minor planets)

References

External links 
 MPEC 2008-H26 : 2008 HJ (Discovery)
 
 
 

Minor planet object articles (unnumbered)
Potential impact events caused by near-Earth objects

20080424